The 2002 United States Senate election in New Jersey was held on November 5, 2002. The race was to originally feature Democrat Robert Torricelli against former West Windsor Township mayor Douglas Forrester, who had won the Republican nomination. Torricelli had won the seat when former Senator Bill Bradley elected not to run for a fourth term in 1996.

Torricelli, however, had been the target of an ethics probe and eventually dropped out of the race in late September 2002. Democrats sought to replace him with Frank Lautenberg, who had been the state's senior senator before retiring from New Jersey's other Senate seat at the end of the 106th United States Congress.

After legal proceedings aimed at forcing Torricelli's name to remain on the ballot were filed by Forrester's campaign, the New Jersey Supreme Court ruled that Lautenberg could be placed on the ballot.

In the general election, Lautenberg defeated Forrester by a 9.9% margin, winning a fourth, non-consecutive term as a U.S. senator. At 78, Lautenberg became the oldest non-incumbent to win a Senate election. Lautenberg became the state's junior senator for the second time when he was sworn in on January 3, 2003. (Jon Corzine, who was elected to Lautenberg's old Senate seat, became the senior senator in 2003 as Lautenberg's previous eighteen years in the Senate were not counted as he was starting over.)

Democratic primary

Candidates
 Robert Torricelli, incumbent U.S. Senator

Although Torricelli would later withdraw from the race, he was unopposed for the Democratic nomination on June 4.

Republican primary

Candidates
 Diane Allen, State Senator from Moorestown
 Doug Forrester, businessman and former Mayor of West Windsor (1981–1982)
 John J. Matheussen, State Senator from Mantua

Withdrew
Guy Gregg, State Assemblyman from Washington Township (Morris County) (withdrew April 8, endorsed Treffinger)
Robert W. Ray, former Whitewater special counsel (withdrew April 8)
James Treffinger, Essex County Executive and candidate for Senate in 2000 (withdrew April 22)

Declined
Lewis Eisenberg, former chairman of the Port Authority of New York and New Jersey 
Steve Forbes, publisher of Forbes magazine and candidate for President in 1996 and 2000 
Thomas Kean, former Governor of New Jersey (1982–90)

Campaign
Many Republicans were eager to take on Torricelli, who was the subject of a federal investigation into his fundraising practices in his 1996 election.

James Treffinger became the first candidate to officially announce his campaign in November 2001, shortly after the state elections which ended a decade of Republican rule. Much speculation at the time revolved around popular former Governor Thomas Kean, whom party chair Joe Kyrillos referred to as a "star player."

At the April 8 filing deadline, the two trailing candidates, Assemblyman Guy Gregg and attorney Robert Ray, dropped out of the race. Gregg endorsed Treffinger, who seemingly became the front-runner for the nomination.

However, Treffinger's campaign collapsed less than two weeks later, when his office was raided by federal agents as part of an investigation into his acceptance of campaign contributions in exchange for public contracts. Many state and national Republicans withdrew their support from Treffinger. Four days after the raid, he withdrew from the race.

Results

Aftermath
Treffinger was arrested in October and indicted by U.S. Attorney Chris Christie on twenty counts of extortion, fraud, obstructing a federal investigation, and conspiracy. He pleaded guilty in May 2003 to one count of obstruction and one count of mail fraud.

General election

Candidates
Doug Forrester, businessman and former mayor of West Windsor (Republican)
Ted Glick (Green)
Frank Lautenberg, former U.S. Senator (1983–2001) (Democratic)
Elizabeth Macron (Libertarian)
Greg Pason (Socialist)
Norman E. Wahner (Conservative)

Withdrew
Robert Torricelli, incumbent U.S. Senator since 1997 (Democratic)

Campaign
Torricelli dropped out of the race on September 30 due to ethical problems and poor poll numbers against Forrester, a relatively unknown opponent.  The New Jersey Democratic Party convinced the retired Lautenberg to join the race after Torricelli dropped out. In the case of The New Jersey Democratic Party v. Samson, 175 N.J. 178 (2002), Forrester sued to stop Democratic Party efforts to have Lautenberg replace Torricelli. The New Jersey Supreme Court ruled unanimously on October 2 that the party could switch Lautenberg's name in for Sen. Torricelli's on the ballot. Forrester received the endorsement of President George W. Bush.

Complete video of debate, September 5, 2002
Complete video of debate, September 12, 2002
Complete video of debate, October 30, 2002
Complete video of debate, November 2, 2002

Predictions

Polling

with Diane Allen

with Guy Gregg

with John Mattheussen

with James Treffinger

Results

See also 
 2002 United States Senate elections

Notes

References 

2002
New Jersey
2002 New Jersey elections